Elena Adelina Panaet (born 5 June 1993) is a Romanian long-distance and steeplechase runner. In 2020, she competed in the women's half marathon at the 2020 World Athletics Half Marathon Championships held in Gdynia, Poland.

She was suspended for doping for four years from 20 February 2016 to 19 February 2020.

References

External links 
 

Living people
1993 births
Place of birth missing (living people)
Romanian female long-distance runners
Romanian female steeplechase runners
Romanian sportspeople in doping cases
Doping cases in athletics
20th-century Romanian women
21st-century Romanian women